Myra Falls may refer to:

 Myra Falls, Canada, a waterfall at Buttle Lake, Vancouver Island, Canada
 Myra Falls (Lower Austria), waterfalls in Muggendorf, Lower Austria, Austria